Jordan Ponchez Mason (born May 24, 1999) is an American football running back for the San Francisco 49ers of the National Football League (NFL). He played college football at Georgia Tech.

College career
Mason played college football at Georgia Tech, positioned as a running back all four years of his attendance from 2018 - 2021. In his freshman year, Mason completed 108 carries averaging 6.1 yards per carry, totaling 659 yards and seven touchdowns.

Collegiate statistics

Professional career

San Francisco 49ers
Mason signed with the San Francisco 49ers as an undrafted free agent in 2022. He made the 49ers' initial 53-man roster out of training camp. On December 15, 2022, Mason iced the game against the Seattle Seahawks with a 56 yard run, which also guaranteed the 49ers would win the NFC West.  In Week 17 against the Las Vegas Raiders, he scored his first NFL touchdown. In the 2022 season, Mason had 43 carries for 258 rushing yards and one rushing touchdown in 16 games.

References

External links

 San Francisco 49ers bio
 Georgia Tech Yellow Jackets bio

Living people
American football running backs
Georgia Tech Yellow Jackets football players
San Francisco 49ers players
1999 births
People from Gallatin, Tennessee